The Wagner tuba is a four-valve brass instrument named after and commissioned by Richard Wagner. It combines technical features of both standard tubas and French horns, though despite its name, the Wagner tuba is more similar to the latter, and usually played by horn players. Wagner commissioned the instrument for his four-part opera cycle Der Ring des Nibelungen, where its purpose was to bridge the acoustical and textural gap between the French horn and trombone.

The sound produced by this instrument has been variously described as "smoky," "metallic," "unearthly" and "majestic." Wagner tubas (or Tenortuben and Basstuben) are also referred to as Wagnertuben, Waldhorntuben, Bayreuth-tuben, Ring-tuben, or Horn-tuben by German writers, but it is most common to refer to them in English as Wagner tubas. Wagner's published scores usually refer to these instruments in the plural, Tuben, but sometimes in the singular, Tuba.

History 
The Wagner tuba was originally created for Richard Wagner's operatic cycle Der Ring des Nibelungen. Since then, other composers have written for it, most notably Anton Bruckner, in whose Symphony No. 7 a quartet of them is first heard in the slow movement in memory of Wagner, and Richard Strauss, who composed several works that used the Wagner tuba, including his Alpine Symphony.

Wagner was inspired to invent the Wagner tuba after a brief visit to Paris in 1853. He visited the shop of Adolphe Sax, the inventor of the saxophone and saxhorn. They showed him a saxhorn, which is similar to the instrument that Wagner ultimately wanted, and later had constructed by the C. W. Moritz firm in Berlin. Wagner wanted an instrument that had the flexibility of a saxhorn and sound of a lur. There are other instruments considered predecessors to the Wagner tuba: Gottfried Weber's double-slide trombone, as well as the Cornon made by Václav František Červený.

The Wagner tuba aural effect is obtained by a conical bore (like a horn) and the use of the horn mouthpiece (tapered and conical, as opposed to the parabolic cup mouthpiece such as on a trombone). The saxhorn had a more cylindrical and larger bore, used the parabolic cupped mouthpiece, and thus had a more brassy tone that wasn't quite suitable for Wagner's tonal intent.

The Paxman Musical Instruments horn manufacturer continues to produce Wagner tubas in F and B. The workshop of Engelbert Schmid also produces Wagner tubas.

Design 
The Wagner tuba is built with rotary valves, which (like those on the horn) are played with the left hand. Horn players traditionally double on Wagner tubas because the mouthpiece and fingering are identical. The size of the bore of the Wagner tuba is midway between that of a euphonium and a horn.  The Wagner tuba also has a bore size similar to that of a cornophone, which results in a similar sound.

The Wagner tuba nominally exists in two sizes, tenor in B and bass in F, with ranges comparable to those of horns in the same pitches while being less adept at the highest notes. Several 20th-century and later manufacturers have, however, combined the two instruments into a double Wagner tuba that can easily be configured in either B or F.

Wagner tubas are normally written as transposing instruments, but the notation used varies considerably and is a common source of confusion — Wagner himself used three different and incompatible notations in the course of the Ring, and all three of these systems (plus some others) have been used by subsequent composers. 

An additional source of confusion is that the instruments are invariably designated in orchestral scores simply as tubas, sometimes leaving it unclear whether the score means true bass tubas or Wagner tubas. (For example, orchestras sometimes assume the two tenor tubas in Janáček's Sinfonietta are Wagner tubas, when the score means euphoniums.)

The name "Wagner tuba" is considered problematic, possibly incorrect, by many theorists. Kent Kennan says they are poorly named since "they are really modified horns" rather than tubas.

Impact 

Composers such as Wagner who made use of this instrument would later inspire future composers to also write for the Wagner tuba. Wagner tubas appear in the work of composers such as Richard Strauss, Anton Bruckner, Béla Bartók, and many more. Anton Bruckner employed Wagner tubas in his Seventh and Ninth Symphonies. In both symphonies, the four Wagner tubas are played by players who alternate between horn and Wagner tuba, which is the same procedure Wagner used in the Ring. This change is simplified by the fact that the horn and Wagner tuba use the same mouthpiece and same fingering. 

As time passed, the availability and convenience of including Wagner tubas in concert programs became a reoccurring problem. In the 20th century, prominent composers such as Arnold Schoenberg and Igor Stravinsky began to write sparingly for the instrument, while other composers attempted to continue writing for it in the 1960s. These composers would continue to face the same difficulties as their predecessors, which would ultimately lead to composers avoiding writing for the instrument altogether. 

Rued Langgaard, a great admirer of Bruckner, wrote for eight horns in his First Symphony (1908-11); four of these parts were written for tenor and bass Wagner tubas. When this work was eventually premiered, the orchestra decided against using Wagner tubas, instead playing the parts on horn. This experience led to a frustrated Langgaard to exclude Wagner tubas from future works.

Repertoire 
Wagner tubas are typically played by players who are also playing a horn. In an orchestral score, the staves for the Wagner tubas then logically go below those of the horns and above the standard tubas. If they are played by players who are not also playing a horn, they are placed below the trombones, above the regular tuba, which is then called a "contrabass tuba."

These composers have written for the instrument:

 Thomas Adès
 Béla Bartók
 Anton Bruckner
 Friedrich Cerha
 Stephen Caudel
 Andrew Downes
 Felix Draeseke
 Alberto Franchetti, Germania
 Jerry Goldsmith
 Sofia Gubaidulina
 Hans Werner Henze
 Leoš Janáček
 Jan Koetsier, Elegie for Wagner Tuba and String Quartet/Orchestra
 Rued Langgaard
 George Lopez, Gonzales the Earth Eater (1 Wagner tuba) and Traumzeit und Traumdeutung (2 Wagner tubas)
 Elisabeth Lutyens
 John Melby
 Michael Nyman
 Alex Prior 
 Einojuhani Rautavaara
 Eurico Carrapatoso
 Esa-Pekka Salonen
 Peter Schat, An Indian Requiem (2 Wagner tubas)
 Arnold Schönberg
 Ragnar Søderlind
 Richard Strauss
 Vladimir Tarnopolsky, Wahnfried (6 Wagner tubas)
 Ricardo Matosinhos
 Robert Davidson
 Igor Stravinsky
 Edgard Varèse
 Richard Wagner
 Alec Wilder
 John Williams
 Bernd Alois Zimmermann

References

Sources

Further reading

External links
  The Wagner Tuba, history, composers and Edel Rhapsody (wagner-tuba.com)
  Felix Draeseke and the Wagner Tuba
 Evolution, Physics and Usage of the Wagner Tuba
 Rehearsal by the Berlin Philharmonic horns 

Opera terminology
Richard Wagner
F instruments
Horns